From Dusk Till Dawn is a 2001 third-person shooter video game that is based on events that transpire directly after the end of From Dusk till Dawn. Released for Windows, it was distributed by Cryo Interactive.

Plot
Seth Gecko, one of the two survivors of the movie From Dusk till Dawn, has been condemned to death for the murders his dead brother Richie committed. He is now an inmate of the fictional Rising Sun high-security prison, a converted tanker floating off the coast of New Orleans.

Vampires infiltrate the prison by posing as inmates. They murder the transport guards and the warden and begin a rampage. In the chaos, Seth gains a weapon and escapes his cell.

At the end, Seth kills the vampires and escapes the prison along with the other survivors.

Reception

The game was met with mixed reception upon release, as GameRankings gave it a score of 63.11%, while Metacritic gave it 58 out of 100.

References

External links

2001 video games
DreamCatcher Interactive games
Third-person shooters
Video games about vampires
Video games based on films
Video games developed in France
Windows games
Windows-only games
Cryo Interactive games
From Dusk till Dawn (franchise)
Video games set in prison
Video games set in Louisiana